Nouakchott Kings is a Mauritanian football club based in Nouakchott and one of the main competitors for the Ligue 1 Mauritania title every year.

History
The club was found in 1997  under the name Association Sportive Culturelle Nasr Teyarett  , and was later renamed ASC Nasr Zem Zem in 2013.

After it purchase by Abdellahi Ould Sidiyah in 2016, the club was renamed Nouakchott Kings.

Honors
Coupe du Président de la République
Winners (2): 2013,2022
Runners-up (1): 2018

Performance in CAF competitions
CAF Confederation Cup: 1 appearance
2018–19 – Preliminary round

External links
Team profile - FFRIM official website
Team profile - soccerway.com

Football clubs in Mauritania

Sport in Nouakchott